Nikolay Ivanov (born 2 June 1942) is a Russian sprinter. He competed in the men's 200 metres at the 1968 Summer Olympics.

References

1942 births
Living people
Athletes (track and field) at the 1968 Summer Olympics
Russian male sprinters
Olympic athletes of the Soviet Union
Place of birth missing (living people)
Soviet male sprinters